Tam Hiệp is a ward located in Biên Hòa city of Đồng Nai province, Vietnam. It has an area of about 2.1km2 and the population in 2017 was 35,747.

References

Bien Hoa